Vukasović is a Serbo-Croatian surname, a patronymic derived from the Slavic name Vukas, a variant of Vuk. Notable people with the surname include:

 Nenad Vukasović (born 1952), Serbian politician
 Vid Vuletić Vukasović (1853–1933), writer and ethnographer from Dubrovnik
 Marko Vukasović (born 1990), Montenegrin footballer
 Mladen Vukasović (born 1992), Montenegrin footballer
 Josef Philipp Vukassovich (1755–1809), Habsburg Croatian military commander
 Ivanka Vukasović, Serbian film editor (W.R.: Mysteries of the Organism)
 Volcasso (or Vukasović), Ragusan noble family

See also
Vukasovići, village in Bosnia

Serbian surnames
Croatian surnames